Cristóbal Island (in Spanish: Isla San Cristóbal, or Saint Christopher's Island) is a mostly deforested 37 km2 island located south of Isla Colón, in the Bocas del Toro Archipelago, Panama. It is home to the indigenous Ngäbe or Guaymí people and a small number of expatriates.

Laguna Bocatorito, also known as Dolphin Bay, lies on the east side of the island.

See also
List of islands of Panama

References

Caribbean islands of Panama